Pedro Chaluja (born 14 March 1962) is a Panamanian football administrator, president of the Panamanian Football Federation, and a member of the CONCACAF Council and the FIFA Council.

References

1962 births
FIFA officials
Living people
Panamanian sportspeople